NCIT may refer to:

 Nepal College of Information Technology, a college in Nepal
 North Coast Inland Trail, a trail project in Ohio, United States
 National Catholic Invitational Tournament, a US college basketball tournament 1949-1952